My Extraordinary Summer with Tess is a 2019 Dutch drama film directed by Steven Wouterlood. It is based on the book of the same name by Anna Woltz. In July 2019, it was shortlisted as one of the nine films in contention to be the Dutch entry for the Academy Award for Best International Feature Film at the 92nd Academy Awards, but it was not selected.

Cast
 Sonny Coops Van Utteren as Sam
 Josephine Arendsen as Tess
 Tjebbo Gerritsma as father Sam
 Jennifer Hoffman as mother Tess

References

External links
 

2019 films
2019 drama films
Dutch drama films
2010s Dutch-language films